Denise A. Hines is an American psychologist doing research on domestic violence and sexual abuse with focuses on prevention, intervention, and public policy. She is an associate professor in the Department of Psychology at Clark University in Worcester, Massachusetts.

Education and scientific career
Hines received a B.S. degree in psychology in 1995 from the College of the Holy Cross. In 1997 she enrolled in the graduate program at Boston University, where she obtained her Ph.D in 2003 writing a thesis on domestic violence under the mentorship of Kimberly Saudino. For the subsequent two years, she was a post-doc at the Family Research Laboratory and Crimes Against Children Research Center at the University of New Hampshire, where she worked with Murray A. Straus and David Finkelhor. In 2007, she joined the faculty in the Department of Psychology at Clark University, where she co-directs the Clark Anti-Violence Education Program. She is also the director of the Family Impact Seminars, for state politicians and policymakers.

Scientific research

Hines studies the effectiveness of college prevention and intervention services for sexual assault, dating violence and stalking. She does this at her own university, by designing and evaluating the effectiveness of various interventions at the Clark Anti-Violence Education (CAVE) program.

In a series of projects, Hines have studied the physical and mental health of male victims of domestic violence from their female partners, as well as the mental and physical health of children that has witnessed domestic violence in their homes.

Media
On the topic of domestic violence, Hines' has been interviewed or her research has been quoted by different media outlets, such as the Worcester Magazine the Colorado State University College News, Fox News, the Dallas Morning News, Finding Dulcinea, EmaxHealth, the Vancouver Sun in Canada, and Le Point in France.

Selected publications

Books
 Malley-Morrison K, Hines D. Family violence in a cultural perspective: Defining, understanding, and combating abuse. Sage; 2004.
 Hines DA, Malley-Morrison K, Dutton LB. Family violence in the United States: Defining, understanding, and combating abuse. Sage Publications; 2012 Dec 4.

Scientific articles
 Hines DA, Malley-Morrison K. Psychological effects of partner abuse against men: A neglected research area. Psychology of Men & Masculinity. 2001 Jul;2(2):75.
 Hines DA, Saudino KJ. Intergenerational transmission of intimate partner violence: A behavioral genetic perspective. Trauma, Violence, & Abuse. 2002 Jul;3(3):210-25.
 Hines DA, Saudino KJ. Gender differences in psychological, physical, and sexual aggression among college students using the Revised Conflict Tactics Scales. Violence and victims. 2003 Apr 1;18(2):197-217.
 Hines DA, Brown J, Dunning E. Characteristics of callers to the domestic abuse helpline for men. Journal of Family Violence. 2007 Feb 1;22(2):63-72.
 Hines DA. Predictors of sexual coercion against women and men: A multilevel, multinational study of university students. Archives of sexual behavior. 2007 Jun 1;36(3):403-22.
 Hines DA, [ |Douglas EM . Women's use of intimate partner violence against men: Prevalence, implications, and consequences. Journal of Aggression, Maltreatment & Trauma. 2009 Aug 19;18(6):572-86.
 Hines DA, Douglas EM. A closer look at men who sustain intimate terrorism by women. Partner Abuse. 2010 Jan 1;1(3):286.
 Hines D, Douglas E. Intimate terrorism by women towards men: does it exist?. Journal of aggression, conflict and peace research. 2010 Jul 6;2(3):36-56.
 Douglas EM, Hines DA. The helpseeking experiences of men who sustain intimate partner violence: An overlooked population and implications for practice. Journal of family violence. 2011 Aug 1;26(6):473-85.
 Hines DA, Palm Reed KM. Predicting improvement after a bystander program for the prevention of sexual and dating violence. Health promotion practice. 2015 Jul;16(4):550-9.
 Hines DA, Douglas EM. Sexual aggression experiences among male victims of physical partner violence: Prevalence, severity, and health correlates for male victims and their children. Archives of sexual behavior. 2016 Jul 1;45(5):1133-51.
 Hines DA, Douglas EM. Influence of intimate terrorism, situational couple violence, and mutual violent control on male victims. Psychology of men & masculinity. 2018 Oct;19(4):612.
 Harman JJ, Kruk E, Hines DA. Parental alienating behaviors: An unacknowledged form of family violence. Psychological bulletin. 2018 Dec;144(12):1275.

External links

 Clark University, Denise Hines
 Google Scholar, Denise Hines

References

Living people
Domestic violence academics
Clark University faculty
College of the Holy Cross alumni
Boston University alumni
Year of birth missing (living people)